Foreign relations of Saudi Arabia are the diplomatic and trade relations between Saudi Arabia and other countries around the world. The foreign policy of Saudi Arabia is focused on co-operation with the oil-exporting Gulf States, the unity of the Arab world, Islamic solidarity, and support for the United Nations. In practice, the main concerns in recent years have been relations with the US, the Saudi Arabian–led intervention in Yemen, the Israeli–Palestinian conflict, Iraq, the perceived threat from the Islamic Republic of Iran, and the effect of oil pricing. Saudi Arabia contributes large amounts of development aid to Muslim countries. From 1986 to 2006, the country donated £49 billion in aid.

Although a member of the Non-Aligned Movement, Saudi Arabia is described as leading the "Pro-Western Camp" of Arab countries, aligned with the U.S. and composed of Egypt, Jordan, and Arab states of the Persian Gulf. Saudi Arabia and the United States are close strategic allies and partners. However, the relationship witnessed certain decline during the last years of the Obama administration, but strengthened following the election of President Donald Trump who forged close ties with the Saudi royal family. Sunni Islam is the main religion of Saudi. China and Saudi Arabia are major allies, with relationship between the two countries growing significantly in recent decades. A majority of Saudi Arabians have expressed a favorable view of China.

As a founding member of OPEC, Saudi Arabia's long-term oil pricing policy has been to keep prices stable and moderate—high enough to earn large amounts of revenue, but not so high as to encourage alternative energy sources among oil importers, or jeopardise the economies of Western countries where many of its financial assets are located and which provide political and military support for the Saudi government. The major exception to this occurred during the 1973 oil crisis when Saudi Arabia, with the other Arab oil states, used an embargo on oil supplies to pressure the US to stop supporting Israel.

Saudi Arabia is a founding member of several multinational organizations, including OPEC, the United Nations, the Arab League. It is also a founding member of the Gulf Cooperation Council, Muslim World League, the Organisation of Islamic Cooperation, and the Islamic Development Bank—all of which are headquartered in Saudi. The country plays a prominent role in the International Monetary Fund, the World Bank, and in 2005 joined the World Trade Organization.

According to a UCLA history professor, Saudi Arabia recently has become much more active in terms of foreign and security policy for three reasons: the Arab uprisings of 2010 and 2011, the policies of the Obama administration and the collapse of oil prices.

History
After World War II (1939–1945) and during the Cold War (–1991), Saudi Arabia maintained an anti-Communist, anti-secular Arab-nationalist policy, often working with the leading anti-communist power, the United States.  Following the 1973 oil crisis, when Saudi Arabia and other Arab oil exporters embargoed the United States and its allies for their support of Israel, oil revenues increased dramatically, and the Kingdom worked to become the leading Islamic state, spending generously to advance Islam and particularly its conservative school (known as Wahhabism).  Supporters see this as having purified and unified the Islamic faith; other commentators claim it has eroded regional Islamic cultures. (Examples of the acculturizing effect of Saudi aid can be seen among the Minangkabau and the Acehnese in Indonesia, as well as among the people of the Maldives. The Wahhabi form of Islam is also perceived in the West as a source of Islamist extremism.

Saudi Arabia and its oil policy were significant factors in the proxy wars of the cold war prior to the downfall of Soviet Communism in the late 1980s and early 1990. Saudi Arabia helped to finance not just the Afghan Mujahideen but also non-Muslim anti-communists. It also seriously harmed the Soviet Communist cause by stabilizing oil prices "throughout the 1980s, just when the Russians were desperate to sell energy in order to keep up with huge hikes in American military spending."

Following King Fahd's stroke in 1995, Abdullah, then Crown Prince, assumed responsibility for foreign policy. A marked change in U.S.-Saudi relations occurred, as Abdullah sought to put distance between his policies and the unpopular pro-Western policies of King Fahd. Abdullah took a more independent line from the US and concentrated on improving regional relations, particularly with Iran. Several long-standing border disputes were resolved, including significantly reshaping the Saudi border with Yemen. The new approach resulted in increasingly strained relations with the US. Despite this, the U.S. and Saudi Arabia remained close. In 1998 Abdullah paid a state visit to Washington and met with U.S. President Bill Clinton.

In 2003 Abdullah's new policy was reflected in the Saudi government's refusal to support or to participate in the U.S.-led invasion of Iraq. Some US critics saw this as an attempt by the Saudi royal family to placate the kingdom's Islamist radicals. That same year Saudi and U.S. government officials agreed to the withdrawal of all U.S. military forces from Saudi soil. After ascending the throne, King Abdullah followed a more activist foreign policy and continued to push-back on US policies which were unpopular in Saudi Arabia (for example, refusing to provide material assistance to support the new Iraqi government). However, increasingly, in common with the US, fear and mistrust of Iran became a significant factor in Saudi policy. In 2010 the whistle-blowing website WikiLeaks disclosed various confidential documents revealing that King Abdullah had urged the U.S. to attack Iran in order to "cut off the head of the snake". Saudi Arabia has long since used its alliance with the United States as a counterbalance to Iran's influence in the Middle East, and Saudi Arabia and other Arab states of the Persian Gulf have looked to the United States for protection against Iran.

Relations with the US and other Western countries became further strained by the fact that Saudi Arabia has been a source of Islamist terrorist activity world-wide. Osama bin Laden and 15 out of the 19 September 11 attacks hijackers were Saudi nationals, though some officials argue that bin Laden planned this deliberately in an attempt to strain U.S.-Saudi relations, and former Central Intelligence Agency director James Woolsey described Saudi Arabian Wahhabism as "the soil in which al-Qaeda and its sister terrorist organizations are flourishing". Some in the U.S. Government also believe that the royal family, through its long and close relations with Wahhabi clerics, had laid the groundwork for the growth of militant groups like al-Qaeda ,and that after the attacks had done little to help track the militants or prevent future atrocities.

As announced at the 2009 Arab League summit, Saudi Arabia had intended to participate in the Arab Customs Union to be established in 2015 and in an Arab common market to be established by 2020.

Following the wave of early-2011 protests and revolutions affecting the Arab world, Saudi Arabia offered asylum to deposed President Zine El Abidine Ben Ali of Tunisia, and King Abdullah telephoned President Hosni Mubarak of Egypt (prior to Mubarak's deposition) to offer his support.

Saudi military forces and their allies became involved in conflict in Yemen (on Saudi Arabia's southern borders) from March 2015 onwards.

Islam 
According to the FFGI at Goethe University Frankfurt, wahhabist ideology is spread globally with organisations closely associated with the government of Saudi Arabia such as the Muslim World League (WML) and the World Association of Muslim Youth are actively participating.

According to government-associated paper Ain Al-Yaqeen article in 2002, Saudi government-sponsored projects were active in non-Muslim countries in Europe, North and South America, Africa, Australia and Asia. These encompassed 210 Islamic centres which were completely or partly funded by the Saudi kingdom, 1500 mosques, 202 colleges and almost 2000 schools. The House of Saud has inaugurated 1359 mosques in Europe.

In February 2019, Saudi Arabia's Crown Prince Mohammad bin Salman defended Xinjiang re-education camps for Muslims, saying "China has the right to carry out anti-terrorism and de-extremisation work for its national security." China has allegedly imprisoned up to 2 million Muslims in concentration camps, where they are subject to abuse and torture.

Bilateral relations

Africa

America

Asia

Europe

Oceania

Public relations and propaganda
The reputation of Saudi Arabia in the West has always been controversial due to its record of human rights abuses and the Saudi involvement in the Yemen civil war.

The United Kingdom and United States have become a major centre for public relations (PR) supporting the Saudi regime. Lina Khatib, head of the Middle East and north Africa programme at Chatham House said that Saudi Arabia had embarked upon a "wide-ranging PR campaign focused on the UK and the US" since 2016, which involved English-language content targeting a British audience. This PR, linked with the support of Theresa May in arms sales during the war in Yemen. In the UK, media PR depicted Mohammed bin Salman as a reforming prince, and major newspapers ran adverts promoting Bin Salman's 'reform agenda'.

This image has been undermined by disappearance and apparent Saudi state-sanctioned murder of Washington Post journalist Jamal Khashoggi. Following these allegations, US Secretary of State, Mike Pompeo said, "We call on the government of Saudi Arabia to support a thorough investigation of Mr Khashoggi's disappearance and to be transparent about the results of that investigation" and a UK Foreign Office spokesman said, "These are extremely serious allegations. We are aware of the latest reports and are working urgently to establish the facts, including with the government of Saudi Arabia." France also sought an explanation as to how an "accomplished and esteemed" journalist such as Khashoggi vanished.

Following the murder of Khashoggi, Germany's Chancellor Angela Merkel halted the sale of weapons to Saudi. A non-binding resolution was also voted in the European Parliament to "impose an EU-wide arms embargo on Saudi Arabia". Canadian Prime Minister Justin Trudeau threatened to cancel a multimillion-dollar defence contract amidst the Khashoggi controversy.

Consulum, a London-based PR firm primarily staffed by former Bell Pottinger employees, has worked on communications programmes with the Saudi Arabian government and PR firm Freud Communications, which has worked with the kingdom in propagating the Saudi Vision 2030 relaunch under Bin Salman, distanced itself from the regime following the disappearance of Khashoggi. Pagefield Global Counsel and Kekst CNC (a London division of French PR company Publicis) have said that they previously worked with the regime but no longer work in Saudi Arabia.

A number of media companies that have worked with the Saudi state to promote its overseas image. Bin Salman met Vice Media founder Shane Smith in early 2018 on his tour of the US, and Vice has had a team promoting the country with the Saudi Research and Marketing Group (SRMG), a Saudi regime-affiliated publishing group and 'organ of soft power'. SMRG has signed a deal with The Independent to launch foreign-language websites (including Arabic) across the Middle East, which has led to concern over potential editorial influence by the Saudi publisher. SMRG also donates to the Tony Blair Institute for Global Change to facilitate Tony Blair's work on the Saudi modernisation programme.

According to a FARA eFile document filed with the US Department of Justice, the Embassy of Saudi Arabia in Washington, D.C. hired an ex-top lobbyist of the Heritage Foundation for a brief legislative push before the inauguration of 2020 President-elect Joe Biden and his administration. The contract with Off Hill Strategies worth $25,000-per-month was effective from 19 October 2020 through 18 January 2021, two days before the inauguration of President Biden. As per the filing, the PR firm was tasked with serving “federal legislative advocacy and related services to support the Embassy's congressional outreach efforts and further advance bilateral ties between the Kingdom of Saudi Arabia and the United States.” During the primary debate of 2019, Biden was quoted as calling Saudi Arabia a “pariah” and promising to end the US arms sales to Riyadh following its alleged use in the Saudi-led coalition's war in Yemen that has resulted in the deaths of thousands of civilians. Off Hill Strategies has been called the Saudi embassy's first hiring in 2020.

International organization participation
Saudi Arabia is member of the ABEDA, AfDB, AFESD, AL, AMF, BIS, ESCWA, FAO, G-20, G-77, GCC, IAEA, IBRD, ICAO, ICC, ICRM, IDA, IDB, IFAD, IFC, IFRCS, ILO, IMF, International Maritime Organization, Inmarsat, Intelsat, Interpol, IOC, ISO, ITU, NAM, OAPEC, OAS (observer), OIC, OPCW, OPEC, UN, UNCTAD, UNESCO, UNIDO, UPU, WCO, WFTU, WHO, WIPO, WMO, WTrO (Applicant)

See also

 Index of Saudi Arabia–related articles
 Iran-Arab Relations (Saudi Arabia)
 List of diplomatic missions in Saudi Arabia
 List of diplomatic missions of Saudi Arabia
 Territorial disputes in the Persian Gulf

References

Further reading

External links
Ministry of Foreign Affairs
Our enemies, the Saudis. United States relations with Saudi Arabia by Victor Davis Hanson, originally published in Commentary, June 2002.
Saudi Arabia: 14-Year-Old Boy Faces Execution from Human Rights Watch 27 October 2005.
Saudi Arabia to host Israel boycott event by Michael Freund, published in the Jerusalem Post, 7 March 2006
Royal Embassy of Saudi Arabia in Washington, D.C.
Embassy of the United States in Riyadh
Saudi-U.S. Alignment after the Six Day War
 A Saudi-Israeli Deal (an opinion column by Thomas L. Friedman)

 
Saudi Arabia articles needing attention